Arnot is a census-designated place located in Bloss Township, Tioga County in the state of Pennsylvania, United States. It is located off US Route 15 near the borough of Blossburg. As of the 2010 census, the population was 332 residents.

Demographics

Notable people

Entertainer Johnny J. Jones and professional baseball player Red Murray were born here.

References

Census-designated places in Tioga County, Pennsylvania
Census-designated places in Pennsylvania